The Calvary Holiness Church is a small River Brethren denomination of Christianity in the Radical Pietistic tradition and is part of the conservative holiness movement. It is a division from the Brethren in Christ Church.

History 
The Calvary Holiness Church began in 1963 when the Philadelphia Brethren in Christ congregation (org. 1897) withdrew from the Brethren in Christ, rejecting perceived changes in the denomination's faith and practice. The breakaway church wished to continue to emphasize the wearing of a headcovering by women, plain dress, temperance, footwashing, and pacifism.

The church incorporated in 1964, and had two congregations with about 40 members in 1980.

References

External links
 Official website of the Calvary Holiness Church
 Calvary Holiness Church at Adherents.com

Churches in Philadelphia
Christian organizations established in 1963
Holiness organizations established in the 20th century
Holiness denominations
Radical Pietism
River Brethren
1963 establishments in Pennsylvania
Holiness pacifism